Central Building is a building located at 1–3 Pedder Street, at the corner of Queen's Road Central, in Central, Hong Kong.

History
The location was previously occupied by the Hong Kong Hotel. In 1957, under the ownership of Central Development Limited, the former hotel building was renovated and rebuilt. In 1958, it was completed as Central Building.

The original stock certificates of Central Development Limited bore the signature of lead investor Kwan Fan-Fat, owner of Golden Dahlia, the 1949 Hong Kong Derby winner). The commemorative marble foundation stone of Central Building was dedicated by its chairman Hui Oi-Chow on 29 August 1957. Mr. Hui was the patriarch of the Hui family, one of the Four big families of Hong Kong.

Features
It has 17 floors, with the ground floor and basement level being shops and the other floors being offices. Central Building is currently also known for its many medical practitioner tenants.

Nearby landmarks 
 The Landmark
 Pedder Building
 Queen's Road
 Wheelock House
 Entertainment Building

References

Office buildings in Hong Kong
Central, Hong Kong